Mavety is a surname. Notable people with the surname include:

 George W. Mavety (c. 1936–2000), American magazine publisher
 Larry Mavety (1942–2020), Canadian ice hockey player